Marie Müller may refer to:

 Marie Muller (born 1985), Luxembourger judoka
 Marie Müller (artist) (1847–1935), Austrian painter
 Marie Müller (footballer)